The Canton of Fauquembergues is a former canton situated in the Pas-de-Calais département and in the Nord-Pas-de-Calais region of France. It was disbanded following the French canton reorganisation which came into effect in March 2015. It consisted of 18 communes, which joined the canton of Fruges in 2015. It had a total of 9,931 inhabitants (2012).

Geography 
This canton is centred on the town of Fauquembergues in the arrondissement of Saint-Omer. The altitude varies from 43m at (Coyecques) to 201m at (Thiembronne) for an average of 106m.

The canton comprised 18 communes:

Audincthun
Avroult
Beaumetz-lès-Aire
Bomy
Coyecques
Dennebrœucq
Enguinegatte
Enquin-les-Mines
Erny-Saint-Julien
Fauquembergues
Febvin-Palfart
Fléchin
Laires
Merck-Saint-Liévin
Reclinghem
Renty
Saint-Martin-d'Hardinghem
Thiembronne

Population

See also
 Arrondissement of Saint-Omer
 Cantons of Pas-de-Calais
 Communes of Pas-de-Calais

References

Fauquembergues
2015 disestablishments in France
States and territories disestablished in 2015